Jack Connolly (born August 15, 1989) is an American professional ice hockey center who is currently playing for Luleå HF in the Swedish Hockey League (SHL). He formerly played eight games with Leksands IF, where his older brother Chris was also a teammate.

Playing career
Connolly played his high school hockey at The Marshall School, in Duluth, Minnesota before playing junior hockey in the United States Hockey League with the Sioux Falls Stampede during the 2007–08 season. He began playing for the Minnesota-Duluth Bulldogs in the 2008 season. He helped UMD to their first ever NCAA Men's Hockey Championship in 2011. As a senior in 2011–12, Jack finished the regular season ranked second in the nation in scoring and 8th on the Minnesota-Duluth career points with 197 points. Jack Connolly played in every Minnesota-Duluth hockey game during his four years, equalling a total of 166 games. Connolly was named All-American three times and on April 6, 2012, Connolly won the 2012 Hobey Baker Award.

Undrafted, Connolly like his brother, opted to pursue a professional career abroad and signed to play the 2012–13 season, with Swedish team Färjestad BK in Elitserien.

After two seasons, Connolly left as a free agent to sign with fellow SHL club, Leksands IF on April 23, 2014. In the 2014–15 season, Connolly left Leksands after 8 scoreless games to join HockeyAllsvenskan club, Rögle BK on October 9, 2014. Connolly adapted quickly to produce 30 points in 40 games to help Rögle BK gain promotion to return to the SHL.

Career statistics

Awards and honors

References

External links

1989 births
Living people
American men's ice hockey centers
American expatriate ice hockey players in Sweden
Färjestad BK players
Hobey Baker Award winners
Ice hockey people from Duluth, Minnesota
Leksands IF players
Luleå HF players
Minnesota Duluth Bulldogs men's ice hockey players
Sioux Falls Stampede players
Rögle BK players
AHCA Division I men's ice hockey All-Americans